The 1936 National Football League Draft was the 1st draft of National Football League (NFL). It took place on February 8, 1936, at the Ritz-Carlton Hotel in Philadelphia, Pennsylvania. The draft was instituted in an effort to end bidding wars among the league's teams by the arbitrary assignment of negotiating rights to amateur players. It was haphazardly decided that the last place team from the previous season would get the first selection, and the process would continue in reverse order of the standings. Under this structure the Philadelphia Eagles, who finished  at 2–9, would select first.

This was the only draft to have nine rounds; the number increased to ten for the 1937 draft. The first player ever drafted, Jay Berwanger, who had previously been awarded the initial Heisman Trophy, never played in the NFL. His rights were traded by the Philadelphia Eagles to the Chicago Bears, as the Eagles felt they would be unable to meet Berwanger's reported demand of $1000 per game. The Eagles received tackle Art Buss from the Bears in exchange for Berwanger's rights. George Halas was unable to convince Berwanger to sign with the Bears. After this, Berwanger got a job in rubber sales. Riley Smith, the second pick, was the first player drafted to play in the NFL.

Breakdown of players selected
The following is the breakdown of the 81 players selected:

Player selections

Hall of Famers
 Dan Fortmann, guard from Colgate taken 9th round 78th overall by the Chicago Bears.
Inducted: Professional Football Hall of Fame class of 1965.
 Joe Stydahar, tackle from West Virginia taken 1st round 6th overall by the Chicago Bears.
Inducted: Professional Football Hall of Fame class of 1967.
 Wayne Millner, end from Notre Dame taken 8th round 65th overall by the Boston Redskins.
Inducted: Professional Football Hall of Fame class of 1968.
 Alphonse “Tuffy” Leemans, back from George Washington University taken 2nd Round 18th overall by the New York Giants.
Inducted: Professional Football Hall of Fame class of 1978.

Notable undrafted players

Schools with multiple draft selections

References

External links
 NFL Website – 1936 Draft
 databaseFootball Website – 1936 Draft
 Pro Football Hall of Fame
 

National Football League Draft
NFL Draft
Draft
NFL Draft
1930s in Philadelphia
American football in Philadelphia
Sports in Philadelphia
February 1936 sports events
Events in Philadelphia